Thomas Hopkinson Eliot (June 14, 1907 – October 14, 1991) was an American lawyer, politician, and academic who served as chancellor of Washington University in St. Louis and as a congressman in the United States House of Representatives from Massachusetts.

Early life

A great-grandson of Samuel Atkins Eliot and grandson of Charles William Eliot, Eliot was born in Cambridge, Massachusetts into the prominent Eliot family. He attended Browne & Nichols School in Cambridge, graduated from Harvard University in 1928 and was a student at Emmanuel College in Cambridge University, from 1928 to 1929. He graduated from Harvard Law School in 1932 and was admitted to the bar in 1933, commencing practice in Buffalo, New York. He served as assistant solicitor in the United States Department of Labor from 1933 to 1935 and as general counsel for the Social Security Board from 1935 to 1937. He was a lecturer on government at Harvard University from 1937 to 1938, and regional director of the Wage and Hour Division in the Department of Labor from 1939 to 1940.

Career 

In 1938 Eliot, a Democrat, ran for election to the Seventy-sixth Congress, losing to Republican Robert Luce. Eliot defeated Luce in a rematch in 1940, winning election to the Seventy-seventh Congress (January 3, 1941 – January 3, 1943). He was an unsuccessful candidate for renomination in 1942 to the Seventy-eighth Congress and for nomination in 1944 to the Seventy-ninth Congress; both times his successful opponent was the colorful longtime Boston politician James M. Curley.

Eliot saw war service in 1943 as director of the British Division, Office of War Information, London, England, and special assistant to the United States Ambassador. From 1943 to 1944 he was chairman of the appeals committee of the National War Labor Board. He served with the Office of Strategic Services in 1944, and from November 1944 to November 1945 was chief counsel of the Division of Power, U.S. Department of the Interior. In addition, Eliot served as New England chairman of the United Negro College Fund.

After the war, Eliot engaged in the practice of law in Boston from 1945 to 1950, before returning to university life. From 1950 to 1952 he served as the executive director of the Massachusetts Special Commission on the Structure of the State Government. In 1952 he was appointed professor of political science at Washington University in St. Louis, where he wrote Governing America; the Politics of a Free People: National, State, and Local Government, and  American Government: Problems and Readings in Political Analysis. He was a professor of constitutional law from 1958 to 1961. In 1961 he moved to the Washington University College of Liberal Arts, serving as dean from 1961 to 1962, and chancellor from 1962 to 1971. He also served as vice chairman of the United States Commission on Intergovernmental Relations from 1964 to 1966 and as president of the Salzburg Global Seminar from 1971 to 1977; and as a teacher at Buckingham, Browne & Nichols School in Cambridge, Massachusetts (his high school alma mater, which had merged with another school), from 1977 to 1985.

Personal life and Death 
He married Lois Jameson and they had two children.
Eliot was a resident of Cambridge until his death there in 1991. He was interred at Mount Auburn Cemetery in Cambridge, Massachusetts.

Bibliography
 Eliot, Thomas H. Recollections of the New Deal: When the People Mattered. Edited with an introduction by John Kenneth Galbraith. Boston: Northeastern University Press, 1992;
 Eliot, Thomas H. Public and Personal. Edited by Frank O'Brien. St. Louis: Washington University Press, 1971.

References

External links

Biographical entry at Washington University in St. Louis
Biographical entry at the Social Security Administration
Salzburg Global Seminar

1907 births
1991 deaths
American Unitarians
Eliot family (America)
Harvard Law School alumni
Chancellors of Washington University in St. Louis
Washington University in St. Louis faculty
Burials at Mount Auburn Cemetery
Democratic Party members of the United States House of Representatives from Massachusetts
Buckingham Browne & Nichols School alumni
20th-century American politicians
Lyndon B. Johnson administration personnel
20th-century American lawyers
Lawyers from Buffalo, New York
Lawyers from St. Louis
Lawyers from Boston
Franklin D. Roosevelt administration personnel
Truman administration personnel
Alumni of the University of Cambridge
Harvard College alumni